In Māori tradition, Hoturapa was a chief of Hawaiki. His wife Kuramarotini owned the canoe Matahourua. One day, Hoturapa and his wife went out fishing in the Matahourua with their friend Kupe. Kupe tricked Hoturapa to dive into the water to free one of the lines. Once Hoturapa was overboard, Kupe set sail for New Zealand with Kuramarotini (Tregear 1891:86, 186).

References
E.R. Tregear, Maori-Polynesian Comparative Dictionary (Lyon and Blair: Lambton Quay), 1891.

Māori mythology
Legendary Polynesian people